Chandrai is a village in Ahore tehsil of Jalore District of Rajasthan state in India.

Geography

Demographics
Population of Chandrai is 3,249 according to census 2001. Where the male population is 1,616 and the female population is 1,633.

References

Villages in Jalore district